Tema Community 1 is a residential area in Tema in the Greater Accra Region of Ghana. Community One is the central part of Tema which trade and transportation is located. This place serves as a link to the harbour. 

This part of Tema is known for the Our Lady of Mercy Senior High School. The school is a second cycle institution. The community was created by the first President of Ghana, Kwame Nkrumah.

References

Tema